South Pole or Southpole may refer to:

Terrestrial, celestial and planetary South Poles
South Pole – the southernmost point on Earth (on the axis of rotation)
South Magnetic Pole – the shifting point on the Earth's surface where the Earth's magnetic field points directly upwards
South Geomagnetic Pole  – the point of intersection of the Earth's surface with the axis of a simple magnetic dipole (like a bar magnet) that best approximates the Earth's actual more complex magnetic field
Southern pole of inaccessibility – the point in Antarctica farthest from the sea 
South celestial pole – an imaginary point in the southern sky towards which the Earth's axis of rotation points
South Pole Wall – a massive wall of galaxies extending over 700 light-years across the universe
For information about South Poles on other planets and Solar System bodies, see Poles of astronomical bodies

Physics
 Originally by analogy with the Earth's magnetic field, the terms "north pole" and "south pole" are also applied to magnets in general

Other
 South Pole Group, a financing company 
 Southpole (clothing), a US clothing company

See also

 North Pole (disambiguation)
 South (disambiguation)
 Pole (disambiguation)